Acta Orientalia Academiae Scientiarum Hungaricae is a quarterly peer-reviewed academic journal published by Akadémiai Kiadó (Budapest, Hungary). It covers  oriental studies, including Turkic, Mongolian, Manchu-Tungusian, Chinese, Japanese, Tibetan, Indian, Iranian and Semitic philology, linguistics, literature, and history of the pre-modern era. It was established in 1950. The editor-in-chief is Gábor Kósa (Eötvös Loránd University).

Abstracting and indexing
The journal is abstracted and indexed in the Arts & Humanities Citation Index, Bibliographie linguistique/Linguistic Bibliography, Historical Abstracts, MLA International Bibliography, and Scopus.

References

External links

Asian studies journals
Quarterly journals
Publications established in 1950
Multilingual journals